Efraín Dimayuga Lorenzo (born June 1, 1989) in Guerrero is a former Mexican professional football midfielder.

References

External links
 
 

1989 births
Living people
Footballers from Guerrero
Association football midfielders
Chiapas F.C. footballers
Indios de Ciudad Juárez footballers
Club Puebla players
Lobos BUAP footballers
Atlante F.C. footballers
Xelajú MC players
Liga MX players
Mexican expatriate footballers
Expatriate footballers in Guatemala
Mexican expatriate sportspeople in Guatemala
Mexican footballers